United Nations Security Council Resolution 332, adopted on April 21, 1973, after a complaint by the representative from Lebanon, the Council grieved for the tragic loss of civilian life incurred in 1973 Israeli raid on Lebanon in the context of Palestinian insurgency in South Lebanon. The Council condemned Israel for its continued violations of international law and called upon Israel to desist forthwith.

The resolution was adopted by 11 votes to none, with four abstentions from the People's Republic of China, Guinea, the Soviet Union and United States.

See also
 History of Lebanon
 List of United Nations Security Council Resolutions 301 to 400 (1971–1976)

References 
Text of the Resolution at undocs.org

External links
 

 0332
 0332
Palestinian insurgency in South Lebanon
1973 in Israel
1973 in Lebanon
Military responses by Israel to the Munich massacre
 0332
April 1973 events